Kumasi Hive is an innovation hub located in Kumasi, Ghana. The hub is a collaborative makerspace for entrepreneurs to prototype ideas and developing products that has market value. It seeks to develop a sustainable business in Ghana and has produced some brands in Ghana and beyond.

The hub provides innovative support to projects with business models, provides space for hardware and products for youth entrepreneurs. The Hub has two incubation or accelerator activities; hardware incubator and business accelerator.

Achievements 
 Kumasi Hive Wins 2018 Miss Africa Digital Prize Worth $5,000
Solar Taxi, a renewable energy project sponsored by MasterCard Foundation

References 

Organisations based in Ghana